Tender Is the Night is a 1934 novel by F. Scott Fitzgerald.

Tender Is the Night may also refer to:

Film and television
 Tender Is the Night (film), a 1962 film adaptation of the novel
 Tender Is the Night, a 1985 TV mini-series adaptation of the novel

Music
 "Tender Is the Night", a 1961 song by Tony Bennett on the 1962 album I Left My Heart in San Francisco
 Also used in the 1962 film Tender Is the Night
 Tender Is the Night (Johnny Mathis album), 1964
 Tender Is the Night (Old Man Luedecke album), 2012
 "Tender Is the Night" (song), a 1983 song by Jackson Browne
 "Tender Is the Night", a 1999 song by Blur